The Paranoids is a 2008 Argentine comedy film directed by Gabriel Medina and starring Daniel Hendler.

Cast
Daniel Hendler as Luciano Guana
Martín Feldman as Martin Sherman
Walter Jakob as Manuel Sinovieck
Jazmin Stuart as Sofia
Veronica Perdomo as Rocio
Miguel Dedovich as Dodi

Reception
The film has a 40% rating on Rotten Tomatoes.  Ryan Stewart of Slant Magazine awarded the film one and a half stars out of four.

References

External links
 
 

Argentine comedy films
2000s Argentine films